Elizabeth Margaret Sinclair (26 May 1933 – 24 February 2009) was a New Zealand cricketer who played as an all-rounder. She appeared in two Test matches for New Zealand between 1954 and 1961. She played domestic cricket for Otago.

References

External links
 
 

1933 births
2009 deaths
Cricketers from Dunedin
New Zealand women cricketers
New Zealand women Test cricketers
Otago Sparks cricketers